Neels Gap (also known as Frogtown Gap, Frogtown Pass, Neel Gap, and Walasi-yi) is a divide along the Blue Ridge Mountains at the base of the Frogtown Creek in the counties of Union and Lumpkin in the U.S. state of Georgia.

The gap was named after W. R. Neel, a government surveyor.

See also
Walasi-Yi Interpretive Center

References 

Appalachian Trail
Geography of Union County, Georgia
Geography of Lumpkin County, Georgia
Valleys of Georgia (U.S. state)
Drainage divides